Mokolii, also known as Chinaman's Hat, is a basalt islet in Kāneʻohe Bay, Hawaii. The  islet was at one time part of a basaltic ridge on Oahu before marine erosion separated it.

Etymology
Mokolii translates from Hawaiian as "little lizard." "Moko” is an older form of the word "mo’o" and means "lizard" or dragon-like creature; "li’i" means "small" or "tiny." According to the Pele epic in Hawaiian mythology, while the goddess Hiʻiaka was traveling to retrieve Pele’s lover, Hi’iaka killed an evil giant lizard at Kuala. Part of its body fell into the bay and became Mokoli’i: the island is the tip of the tail sticking out of the water. The closest land on the main island is Hakipu’u, which bears the broken spine of the lizard, with "haki" meaning to break or broken and “Pu’u” meaning the hill or back.

The alternative name of Chinaman's Hat derives from a comparison of its shape to the Asian conical hat. Of this alternative name, scholar kuʻualoha hoʻomanawanui has written: "It completely erases the Native perspective of the ‘āina as mo’o, a living entity that Hi’iaka—a female, no less—overpowers…Mokoli’i doesn’t exist in isolation as 'Chinaman's Hat' does." A resolution was introduced at the Hawaii State Legislature in 2007, requesting that the Hawaii Tourism Authority discourage the use of the name "Chinaman's Hat" in favor of Mokoliʻi, noting that the name "Chinaman's Hat" "has no historical or cultural significance" and "is offensive to many people of Chinese ancestry." The resolution did not pass the legislature.

Flora and fauna
Both wildlife and plants of Mokoliʻi have been affected by the presence of non-native species, in particular the black rat and yellow crazy ant. Although other species of birds previously nested there, the wedge-tailed shearwater is the only species of bird that nests on Mokoliʻi. Seventy-two species of plants have been identified, the majority of which are invasive non-native species. Native plants thrive in the coastal margins and include ahu awa (Cyperus javanicus), naupaka (Scaevola taccada), and ilima (Sida fallax). Invasive plants which dominate the slopes are Lantana camara, Spanish needles (Bidens alba var. radiata), and christmasberry. The island was designated as a critical habitat for Carter’s panicgrass (Panicum fauriei var. carteri) by the U.S. Fish and Wildlife Service (USFWS) in 1983. In 2002, the USFWS initiated a program to eradicate rats from Mokoliʻi.

History
Mokolii was under private ownership until the 1970s, when the City and County of Honolulu purchased it.

Access
Mokolii is owned by the City and County of Honolulu and is protected by state and federal park regulations. It is open to the public from dawn to dusk. It can be accessed by kayak, boat, surfboard, or by swimming, or wading at low tide. There is also a 20-minute hike to the top of the island.

References

External links

 Mokolii Island on Google Maps As of 15 July 2011
 Mokolii Island on Yahoo! Maps As of 27 May 2007

Islands of Hawaii
Stacks of the United States
Geography of Honolulu County, Hawaii